Green Village may refer to:

Green Village, New Jersey, an unincorporated community
Green Village, Pennsylvania, an unincorporated community

See also
Lochiel Park Green Village, an environmentally friendly residential area in Adelaide, South Australia